The men's freestyle 61 kg is a competition featured at the 2017 Russian National Freestyle Wrestling Championships, and was held in Nazran, Ingushetia, Russia on June 12.

Medalists

Background
2015 57 kg Yarygin and national runner-up Ismail Musukaev is injury, 2015 European Games champion Alexander Bogomoev (neck injury, than stabbed in a bar fight). Dzhamal Otarsultanov missed weight and will likely be unable to compete, pending a final decision by the Russian Federation. In a day competition Russian federation didn't let Dzhamal Otarsultanov competes at the 61 kilos division. Also, Akhmed Chakaev missed weight too, but Federation allowed him to competing.

Results
Legend
F — Won by fall
WO — Won by walkover

Finals

Top half

Section 1

Section 2

Bottom half

Section 3

Section 4

Repechage

References
https://pp.userapi.com/c837335/v837335040/50a4d/kntGobnzoU8.jpg

Specific

Men's freestyle 61 kg